Aleksandr Vyacheslavovich Dovbnya (born 14 April 1987) is a Russian professional football goalkeeper. He plays for FC Torpedo Moscow and FC Torpedo-2.

Career statistics

Honours
Torpedo Moscow
 Russian Football National League : 2021-22

References

External links

Profile by FNL

1987 births
Footballers from Moscow
Living people
Russian footballers
Association football goalkeepers
FC Haka players
FC Sibir Novosibirsk players
FC Nizhny Novgorod (2007) players
FC Torpedo Moscow players
FC Luch Vladivostok players
FC SKA-Khabarovsk players
FC Orenburg players
FC Rotor Volgograd players
Veikkausliiga players
Russian Second League players
Russian First League players
Russian Premier League players
Russian expatriate footballers
Expatriate footballers in Finland
Russian expatriate sportspeople in Finland